Mirandela Airfield  is an airport serving Mirandela, a town in the Norte Region of Portugal.

The terrain around the airport is uneven.

See also
Transport in Portugal
List of airports in Portugal

References

External links
OpenStreetMap - Mirandela Airport
OurAirports - Mirandela Airport

Airports in Portugal
Buildings and structures in Mirandela